Seymour Blicker (born 1940) is a Canadian playwright, screenwriter and novelist from.

He wrote the screenplay for the film The Kid (1997). Blicker also wrote episodes for the television series Urban Angel and Barney Miller.
Plays by Blicker include:
 Up Your Alley (1987)
 Never Judge a Book by Its Cover (1987)
 Home Free
 Pipe Dreams
 Pals (2000)

Books include:
 Blues chased a rabbit (1969)
 Schmucks (1972)
 The last collection (1976)

From 1978 to 1990, Blicker lectured on fiction writing at Concordia University.

He is the father of actor Jason Blicker. Blicker and his son appeared as father and son in the 1994 film No Contest.

References

External links 
 

1940 births
Living people
20th-century Canadian dramatists and playwrights
21st-century Canadian dramatists and playwrights
Canadian male screenwriters
Concordia University alumni
Canadian male dramatists and playwrights
20th-century Canadian male writers
21st-century Canadian male writers